Charles Francis Dougherty (born June 26, 1937) is an American politician from Pennsylvania who served as a Republican member of the U.S. House of Representatives for Pennsylvania's 4th congressional district from 1979 to 1983.

Early life and education
Dougherty was born in Philadelphia and attended St. Helena's School. He graduated from St. Joseph's Preparatory School in 1955.  He served in the United States Marine Corps Reserve, 1957-77 (active duty, 1959–62). He graduated from St. Joseph's College with a B.S. degree in 1959 and did graduate work at the University of Pennsylvania from 1962 to 1964. He worked as a high school teacher from 1962 to 1965. In 1965 to 1966 he was a special agent for the Office of Naval Intelligence, Department of the Navy. He conducted additional graduate work at Temple University in 1967. He was assistant dean of the Community College of Philadelphia from 1966 to 1970, and a high school principal from 1970 to 1972.

Career
He served in the Pennsylvania State Senate for the 5th district from 1972 to 1979.

Dougherty was elected in 1978 and reelected in 1980  as a Republican to the 96th and 97th United States Congresses. In 1978, he defeated Joshua Eilberg who was indicted on charges for money he took while arranging a $14.5 million Federal grant to a Philadelphia hospital.

He was defeated in 1982 by State Representative Robert Borski after his district was renumbered as the 3rd District. He ran against Borski again in 1992, 1998 and 2000, and was defeated each time. 

To date, Dougherty is the last Republican to represent a Philadelphia-based district in Congress. He would be the last Republican to represent any portion of Philadelphia in the House until the 2000 Census resulted in the Bucks County-based 8th District absorbing a small portion of Philadelphia.

References

Sources

1937 births
20th-century American politicians
Schoolteachers from Pennsylvania
American school principals
Living people
Republican Party Pennsylvania state senators
People of the Office of Naval Intelligence
Politicians from Philadelphia
Republican Party members of the United States House of Representatives from Pennsylvania
Saint Joseph's University alumni
Temple University alumni
University of Pennsylvania alumni
United States Marines